Donici is a Romanian surname of Moldovan origin

Notable People 
Alecu Donici (1806-1865), Moldavian, later Romanian poet and translator
Matei Donici (1847–1921), Bessarabian writer, general, and politician
Nicolae Donici (1874–1960), Bessarabian-born Romanian astronomer who settled in France
Conon Arămescu-Donici (1837–1922), Moldavian Metropolitan-Primate of the Romanian Orthodox Church

See also 

 Albot
 Bolohan (surname)
 Moldovan (surname)

References

Surnames of Moldovan origin
Surnames